Mose Auimatagi Jnr (born 28 April 1995, Auckland, New Zealand) is a New Zealand professional boxer of Samoan heritage.

Boxing career

New Zealand and tournament champion 2014–2020 
Auimatagi is a two time New Zealand middleweight champion, a former UBF Asia Pacific middleweight champion, The Force super middleweight Champion, the current OPBF Silver super middleweight champion and WBA Oceania super middleweight champion. He has defeated many credible boxers including Gunnar Jackson, Adrian Taihia, Jordan Tai, and more. Auimatagi trains out of Papatoetoe Boxing Club with Grant Arkell as his trainer and manager. Grant Arkell trained Joseph Parker during his amateur fights. One of Auimatagi's biggest win of his career was against Morgan Jones. In the last round of that bout, Mose got knocked down early in the round, however he returned and TKO his opponent with only 8 seconds left in the fight. Mose comes from a long line of Professional boxers. On 15th of June 2019, Auimatagi took on Australian Kerry Foley for the Interim WBA Oceania and WBC - OPBF Silver Super Middleweight titles. Auimatagi won the fight by sixth round Knockout, winning his fifth and sixth professional boxing titles. On February 2020, Auimatagi took on Ilias Achergui in hopes to get signed by boxing promoter Dean Lonergan. Auimatagi won the fight by Unanimous Decision. On 19th of December 2020, Auimatagi would jump up two weight divisions to take on David Light for the WBO Oriental Crusierweight title. David Light would win the fight by Unanimous Decision, giving Auimatagi his first loss in four years.

Return to boxing 2022–present 
After a two year hiatus, Auimatagi will return to the ring in December 2022, fighting in Dubai. He has been training for 12 weeks before it was announced on the 12th of November on his facebook page.

Professional titles
 New Zealand National Boxing Federation
 New Zealand National middleweight title (158¼ Ibs)
 New Zealand Professional Boxing Association
 New Zealand National middleweight title (159¾ Ibs)
 Universal Boxing Federation
 Asia Pacific middleweight title (159¾ Ibs)
 King in the Ring
 The Force super middleweight title (168 Ibs)
 World Boxing Council
 OPBF Silver super middleweight title (167½ Ibs)
 World Boxing Association
 Oceania super middleweight title (167½ Ibs)
 Oceania East West Super Middleweight title (167½ Ibs)

Professional boxing record

Awards and recognitions 
2019 Gladrap Boxing Awards Boxer of the year (Nominated)
2019 Gladrap Boxing Awards Male boxer of the year (Nominated)
2019 Gladrap Boxing Awards Knockout of the year (Nominated)
2019 Gladrap Boxing Awards Champion of the year (Nominated)

References

1995 births
Living people
Samoan male boxers
Super-middleweight boxers
New Zealand male boxers
Middleweight boxers
New Zealand sportspeople of Samoan descent
Boxers from Auckland
New Zealand professional boxing champions